Phocas or Phokas (from ) may refer to:

Saint Phocas, Bishop of Sinope
Saint Phocas, a 4th-century Christian martyr
Flavius Phocas, Byzantine emperor from 602610
John Phokas, 12th-century pilgrim and writer
Phokas (Byzantine family), Byzantine nobles including:
Nikephoros Phokas the Elder, general
Leo Phokas the Elder, son of Nikephoros, general
Bardas Phokas the Elder, son of Nikephoros, general 
Nikephoros II Phokas, son of Bardas, Byzantine emperor from 963969
Leo Phokas the Younger, son of Bardas, general and curopalates
Bardas Phokas the Younger, son of Leo, general and rebel against Basil II